Little Wars is a game created by H. G. Wells.

Little Wars may also refer to:

 Little Wars (album), a 2008 album by Unwed Sailor
 Little Wars (film), a 1982 Lebanese film
 Little Wars (magazine), a miniature wargaming magazine

See also
 Little War (disambiguation)